Deobandi hadith studies is a field of Islamic scholarship within the Deobandi movement that critically examines and authenticates the sayings and actions of Prophet Muhammad as recorded in the Hadith literature. The Deobandi approach to Hadith studies is based on the principles of the classical scholars of hadith. It involves the critical examination of hadith to determine their authenticity, reliability, and meaning. Deobandi scholars study hadith in their original Arabic language, and they also examine the various chains of transmission (isnads) through which the Hadiths have been transmitted over time. They pay particular attention to the reliability and character of the narrators in these chains, as well as the context in which the hadith was originally narrated. One of the most significant contributions of Deobandi scholars to the field of Hadith studies is their development of a rigorous system of grading hadiths based on their authenticity. This system involves categorizing hadiths into various levels of authenticity, from those that are considered to be completely reliable to those that are considered to be weak or even fabricated. Deobandi scholars have also produced numerous commentaries and explanations of collections of hadith, such as Sahih al-Bukhari and Sahih Muslim, which are considered among the most authoritative collections of Hadith in Sunni Islam.

Definition 

Hadith refers to the recorded sayings, actions, and teachings of Prophet Muhammad. These reports were compiled by his companions and subsequent generations of scholars, forming an important source of guidance for Muslims.

Deobandism is a movement within Sunni Islam that originated in the town of Deoband in India in the mid-19th century. The movement emphasizes the importance of Islamic scholarship and the preservation of traditional Islamic practices and beliefs. Deobandi scholars have made significant contributions to Islamic scholarship in a wide range of fields, including Hadith studies.

Development 
The development of Deobandi hadith studies can be traced back to the founding of the Darul Uloom Deoband in 1866 by a group of scholars who aimed to provide a traditional Islamic education emphasizing the study of hadith and other Islamic sciences. The establishment of a network of madrasas (Islamic seminaries) was closely linked to the development of Deobandi hadith studies, which spread throughout the Indian subcontinent and beyond. The founding of Darul Uloom Deoband marked the beginning of this network and served as a model for other madrasas in the region. As the Deobandi madrasa network grew, it became an important center for Islamic scholarship and a training ground for scholars and teachers who went on to establish their own madrasas in other parts of the region.

The Deobandi approach to Islamic education and scholarship places great emphasis on the study of hadith and the transmission of knowledge through an unbroken chain of teachers and students. Today, the Deobandi madrasa network spans the globe, with thousands of madrasas in countries such as India, Pakistan, Bangladesh, Afghanistan, and the United Kingdom. The study of hadith remains a core component of the curriculum in these madrasas, reflecting the enduring importance of hadith studies within the Deobandi tradition. In India, numerous madrasas follow Deobandi teachings, including Mazahir Uloom, Madinatul Uloom Bagbari, Jamia Islamia Talimuddin, Darul Uloom Nadwatul Ulama, Madrasa Aminia, Madrasa Shahi, and Darul Uloom Waqf. In Bangladesh, these madrasas are known as Qawmi madrasas, and they include Darul Uloom Hathazari, Al Jamia Al Islamia Patiya, Jamia Qurania Arabia Lalbagh, Al-Jamiah Al-Islamiah Obaidia Nanupur, and Jamiatul Uloom Al-Islamia Lalkhan Bazar. Pakistan also has a strong presence of Deobandi madrasas, such as Darul Uloom Karachi, Darul Uloom Haqqania, Jamia Ashrafia, Jamia Tur Rasheed, Jamia Uloom-ul-Islamia, Jamia Binoria, Jamia Faridia, Jamia Farooqia, and Jamia Khairul Madaris. In South Africa, Deobandi madrasas such as Darul Uloom Zakariyya, Darul Uloom Newcastle, and Madrasah In'aamiyyah are notable. The United Kingdom also has several Deobandi madrasas, including Darul Uloom London, Darul Uloom Bury, Madinatul Uloom Al Islamiya, and Darul Uloom Bolton. An example of a Deobandi madrasa from Iran is Darul Uloom Zahedan.

Within Deobandi madrasas, the term Darul Hadith is often used to refer to specialized departments that focus specifically on the study of hadith. The establishment of Darul Hadith departments within Deobandi madrasas reflects the importance placed on the study of hadith within the tradition. These departments typically have a specialized curriculum that emphasizes the critical analysis of Hadith reports and the methodology of Hadith studies. Students in these departments usually have already completed a basic course of Islamic studies and demonstrated proficiency in Arabic grammar and vocabulary. They then begin their study of Hadith texts, with a focus on memorization and accurate recitation of reports.

Initially, the seminaries curriculum focused on the study of the Quran and Hadith, along with subjects such as Arabic grammar, Islamic law, and theology. The seminaries also emphasized the memorization of Hadith texts, with students spending years memorizing thousands of Hadith reports. Over time, the Deobandi approach to Hadith studies became more refined and sophisticated. Scholars developed a range of methodologies for analyzing Hadith texts and assessing their authenticity, drawing on centuries of Islamic scholarship in the field. They also began to write extensively on the subject, producing numerous works defending the authenticity and reliability of Hadith and its role in Islamic jurisprudence.

In recent times, Deobandi madrasas have developed a new approach to Deobandi hadith studies known as Takhassus al-Hadith. This approach is designed for students who have already completed their graduation in hadith and wish to pursue an advanced level of scholarship. Takhassus al-Hadith is equivalent to a PhD program in terms of its rigor and depth of study.

Contribution

Authority of hadith 
For centuries, Muslims have relied on hadith as a primary source of Islamic knowledge, along with the Quran. However, in recent times, some writers, authors, and critics have raised objections about the authenticity and reliability of hadith. To counter these objections and establish the authority of hadith, Deobandi scholars have written several compilations. These compilations aim to provide evidence for the authenticity of hadith and highlight its importance in Islamic jurisprudence.

One of the most well-known compilations is Hujjiyyat al-Hadith by Idris Kandhlawi and Qari Muhammad Tayyib. This work defends the authenticity of hadith against the criticisms of Western scholars and provides evidence from Islamic history to support the authority of hadith. Habib al-Rahman al-'Azmi's Nusrat al-Hadith is another significant work. Masud al-A'zami later translated this Urdu-language work into Arabic, adding a foreword by Muhammad Awwamah. Nusrat al-Hadith is a thorough defence of the hadith and its significance in Islamic law. Other works on the authority of hadith include Al-Intisar li Sunnat Sayyid al-Abrar by Muhammad Tahir al-Murdani, Nata'ij al-Inkar al-Hadith by Sarfaraz Khan Safdar, and Al-Madkhal ila Dirasat al-Hadith al-Nabawi al-Sharif and Dawr al-Hadith fi Takwin al-Munakh al-Islami by Abul Hasan Ali Hasani Nadwi.

In addition, Tadwin-e Hadith by Manazir Ahsan Gilani, Hujjiyyat al-Hadith by Taqi Usmani, Dirasat fi al-Ahadith al-Nabawiyyah by Muhammad Mustafa Azmi, and Al-Fawa'id al-Malakutiyyah fi ann al-Hadith Hujjah by Musa Ruhani Bazi are all important works that defend the authority and authenticity of hadith.

These works are a testament to the importance of hadith in Islamic jurisprudence and the need to defend its authenticity against those who seek to undermine it. By providing evidence from Islamic history and scholarship, these compilations ensure that hadith remains a reliable and authoritative source of guidance for Muslims.

Linguistics of hadith 
Deobandi scholars have played a crucial role in preserving the integrity of hadith by providing linguistic and grammatical services. They have paid exhaustive attention to the linguistic and grammatical aspects of hadith to defend it from being distorted or misrepresented by mischievous elements. One of the key principles of the Deobandi school of thought is to safeguard hadith from external attacks. To achieve this, Deobandi scholars have focused on the linguistic aspects of hadith to impart its hidden meanings and nuances to the Islamic community. To understand the nuances of the words used in hadith, Deobandi scholars have thoroughly studied pre-Islamic poetry and literature. Whenever a word in hadith is ambiguous or equivocal, they delve into the context to determine its true meaning and prevent it from being misrepresented. Hadith frequently employs figurative language, such as metaphors, synecdoche, similes, proverbs, and metonymy. Deobandi scholars have paid particular attention to the figurative language used in hadith, providing explanations of various figures of speech to reveal the true objective of the Prophet Muhammad.

For instance, Idris Kandhlawi, a Deobandi scholar, compiled the book Attaliqussabih, which offers a comprehensive commentary on hadith. In the book, Kandhlawi explains the meaning of the word "shield" used in reference to fasting in hadith. He resolves the phonetic hurdles and provides linguistic explanations, quoting from various trustworthy sources to clarify the meaning to readers. In addition to providing linguistic and grammatical services related to hadith, Deobandi scholars have also contributed to the preservation and dissemination of hadith. They have compiled collections of hadith, provided commentary on existing collections, and taught the principles of hadith to students.

Explanatory works 
Deobandi scholars are renowned for their authoritative and meticulous explanatory works on the hadith. These commentaries bridge the gap between different schools of thought within the Muslim community and provide a balanced interpretation of the teachings of the Qur’an and hadith. Many Deobandi scholars have written commentaries on the six most authentic hadith books, as well as other commonly available works in Arabic, Urdu, and other languages. These commentaries make them an essential resource for Muslims seeking to deepen their understanding of Islam.

Several notable commentaries on Sahih al-Bukhari by Deobandi scholars include Anwar al-Bari by Ahmad Rida al-Bijnori, Fadl al-Bari fi fiqh al-Bukhari by Abd al-Ra'uf al-Hazarawi, Tuhfat al-Qari fi Mushkilat al-Bukhari by Muhammad Idris Kandhlawi, Farhat al-Qari an Sahih al-Bukhari by Shayr Zaman al-Hazarawi, Al-Kawthar al-Jari fi Sharh al-Bukhari by Abd al-Rahman al Murdani, Talkhis al-Bukhari by Shams al-Duha al-Zankuni, Is‘ad al-Bari by Siddiq Ahmad Bandawi, and Al-Abwab wa al-Tarajim by Zakariyya Kandhlawi. Additionally, there are other works on related topics, such as Nibras al-Sari fi Atraf al-Bukhari by Abd al-'Aziz Punjabi, In'am al-Bari fi Sharh Ash'ar al-Bukhari by Ashiq Ilahi Bulandshahri, Izalat al-Qassas-e-Wajh Qal Ba'd al-Nas by Mujib al-Rahman al-Bangladeshi, and Ma Yanfa al-Nas fi Sharh Qal Ba'd al-Nas by Muhammad Tahir al-Rahman.

Sahih Muslim is also one of the six most authentic books of hadith, and Deobandi scholars have written commentaries on it as well. One notable commentary is Fath al-Mulhim fi Sharh Sahih Muslim by Shabbir Ahmad Usmani, which provides an extensive analysis of the text in both Arabic and Urdu. Taqi Usmani has also authored a complement to the commentary called Takmilat Fath al-Mulhim, which adds further insights and explanations to the original commentary and is considered a valuable resource for those studying Sahih Muslim.

One of the most widely studied hadith collections is Sunan al-Nasa’i, which contains over 5,000 hadith organized by topic. Among the Deobandi commentaries on this collection is Faid-al-Samai by Rashid Ahmad Gangohi, which provides a detailed explanation of each hadith and explores its legal and ethical implications. Another important commentary is Al-Muktafa bi Sharh al-Mujtaba by Ahmad Hasan al-Fattani, which not only explains each hadith but also includes a discussion of the different schools of thought within Islamic jurisprudence.

Sahih al-Tirmidhi is another important collection of hadith, containing over 3,000 sayings of the Prophet arranged by topic. Among the Deobandi commentaries on this collection are Al-Tib al-Shadhi by Ashfaq al-Rahman Kandhlawi, which provides a comprehensive explanation of the hadith and their legal and ethical implications, and Hadiyyat al-Ahwadhi by Ibrahim Baliyawi, which focuses on the hadith related to Islamic jurisprudence. Other important Deobandi commentaries on Jami’ al-Tirmidhi include Tanqih al-Shadhi by Shamsul Haq Afghani, which critiques the hadith and offers alternative interpretations, and Ma‘arif al-Sunan by Yusuf Banuri, which provides a detailed analysis of the hadith and their relevance to contemporary Muslim life. Khaza’in al-Sunan by Sarfaraz Khan Safdar is also an important commentary, which provides a detailed analysis of the hadith and their relevance to Islamic jurisprudence.

Commentaries on Sunan Abi Dawud, another important collection of hadith, include Badhl al-Majhud fi Hall Sunan Abi Dawud by Khalil Ahmad Saharanpuri, which explains the hadith and their legal and ethical implications, Intibah al-Ruqud fi Hall-e-Sunan Abu Dawud by Shayr Zaman al-Hazarawi, which provides a detailed analysis of the hadith and their relevance to contemporary Muslim life, and Zubdat al-Maqsud fi Hall-e-Qal Abu Dawud by Muhammad Tahir al-Rahimi, which focuses on the Hadith related to Islamic jurisprudence.

Mishkat al-Masabih is another important hadith collection, containing over 4,000 sayings of the Prophet arranged by topic. Among the Deobandi commentaries on this collection are Al-Ta’liq al-Sabih by Muhammad Idris Kandhlawi, which provides a comprehensive explanation of the hadith and their legal and ethical implications, and Mishalul Masabeeh by Salman Nadwi, which focuses on the hadith related to Islamic jurisprudence.

On Muwatta Imam Malik, one of the earliest volumes of hadith, several Deobandi scholars have published commentary. Zakariyya Kandhlawi's Awjaz al-Masalik ila Muwatta Malik is a well-known commentary on Muwatta Malik. Moreover, Ashfaq al-Rahman Kandhlawi's Kashf al-Mughatta fi Rijal al-Muwatta sheds light on the book's narrators.

Several works by Deobandi academics deal with Sharh Ma'ani al-Athar. Amani al-Ahbar was written by Yusuf Kandhlawi, but he passed away before even finishing one-fourth of the book. Some noteworthy commentaries on the work include Tabhij al-Rawi bi Takhrij Ahadith al-Tahawi by Ashiq Ilahi Bulandshahri, Majani al-Athmar by the same author, and Talkhis al-Tahawi by Husayn Ali Punjabi. Al-Hawi 'ala Mushkilat al-Tahawi by 'Abd al-Rahman al-Kamilpuri and Nathr al-Azhar by Muhammad Amin Aurakza'i are both beneficial sources.

They also have commentaries on other hadīth works. Among them, Qalaid al-Azhar, written by Mahdi Hasan Shahjahanpuri, is a commentary on Kitab al-Athar, which is a collection of hadiths compiled by Muhammad al-Shaybani. Shahjahanpuri also completed one-third of Fadl Allah al-Samad fi Sharh al-Adab al-Mufrad by Fadl Allah al Jilani and wrote a book on the commentary of Ilal al-Tirmidhi by his teacher Abd al-Latif. Another notable work is Tuhfat al-Ikhwan bi Sharh Hadith Shu‘ab al-Iman by Muhammad Idris Kandhlawi, which is a commentary on a collection of hadiths compiled by Muslim ibn al-Hajjaj. Muhammad Hayat Sanbhali wrote Ta‘tir al-Masham fi Sharh Bulugh al-Maram, a commentary on the book Bulugh al-Maram by Ibn Hajar al-Asqalani, which is a collection of hadiths related to Islamic jurisprudence. Ashiq Ilahi Bulandshahri authored Al-Fawa’id al-Saniyyah fi Sharh al-Arbain al-Nawawiyyah, which is a commentary on the Al-Nawawi's Forty Hadith. This book is considered to be one of the most popular and widely studied hadith collections. Tuhfat al-Quddus fi Sharh Bahjat al-Nufus by Zafar Ahmad Usmani is a commentary on Bahjat al-Nufus, a collection of hadiths compiled by Hasan al-Basri. Sharh Shu‘ab al-Imān by Abdullah Qutb Shah Murdani is a commentary on Shu'ab al-Iman by Al-Bayhaqi, which is a collection of hadiths related to Islamic belief and ethics.

Dictations and Lectures 
Deobandi institutions are known for providing comprehensive and recorded hadith lessons, which have led to the creation of a wide range of books that are similar to encyclopedic hadith commentaries. The dictations given by the experienced and knowledgeable lecturers have proven to be useful for students, researchers, scholars, and teachers. The genre of books that emerged as a result of these dictations covers a vast range of hadith literature and has become an essential resource for anyone interested in the study of hadith.

For Sahih al-Bukhari, some of the most significant dictations are Al-Nur al-Sari by Mahmud Hasan Deobandi, Fayd al-Bari by Anwar Shah Kashmiri compiled by Badr-e Alam Mirti, and the dictations of Rashid Ahmad Gangohi compiled by Majid Ali Jaunpuri, Husain Ali Punjabi, and Muhammad Yahya Kandhlawi. Muhammad Yahya's collection of lecture notes, entitled Lami‘ al-Darari, is the most prominent and beneficial among them, as it was edited, annotated, and then printed in Arabic by his son Zakariyya Kandhlawi.

In addition to the dictations of Sahih al-Bukhari mentioned earlier, there are several other dictations available for this hadith collection. One such example is the dictations of Shabbir Ahmad Usmani, which are compiled as Dars-e Bukhari and Fadl al-Bari. Another example is the dictations of Syed Fakhruddin Ahmad, compiled as Idah al-Bukhari. Furthermore, there are dictations available from Hussain Ahmed Madani and Zakariyya Kandhlawi, respectively compiled as Taqrir al-Bukhari.

For Sahih Muslim, the most notable dictations are Al-Hall al-Mufhim by Rashid Ahmad Gangohi and the dictations of Anwar Shah Kashmiri compiled by ‘Abd al A’lā al-Hasani and ‘Alī Ahmad al-A‘żamī, which have not been printed yet.

For Sahih al-Tirmidhi, the dictations of Rashid Ahmad Gangohi edited and annotated by Zakariyya Kandhlawi, known as Al-Kawkab al-Durrī, and Taqrīr al-Tirmidhī by Mahmud Hasan Deobandi, are the most prominent. Other noteworthy dictations include Anwar Shah Kashmiri's Al-‘Arf al-Shadhī compiled by Muhammad Chiragh, and Rashid Ahmad Gangohi's Al-Naf‘ al-Shadhī. Additionally, the dictations of ‘Abd al-Rahmān Kāmilpūrī and Hussain Ahmed Madani are also available.

For Sunan Abu Dawood, the collective dictations of Mahmud Hasan Deobandi, Anwar Shah Kashmiri, and Shabbir Ahmad Usmani in Arabic, compiled by Muhammad Siddīq al-Najib Abadi, known as Anwār al-Mahmūd, is a significant resource that was consulted by the compiler. It is a useful source for anyone interested in studying Sunan Abu Dawood.

For Al-Sunan al-Sughra, the dictations of Rashid Ahmad Gangohi, known as Al-Fayd al-Sama’i, are the most noteworthy.

For Sunan Ibn Majah, the dictations of Rashid Ahmad Gangohi have yet to be published.

Methodology of hadith 
Usul al-Hadith, the methodology of Hadith, is an important field in Islamic studies that deals with understanding the principles and methods of Hadith. Deobandi scholars have made significant contributions to this field, producing numerous works on the subject. These works cover a range of topics related to Usul al-Hadith, including the chain of narration, Hadith terminology, the methods used to evaluate the authenticity of Hadith, and the different types of Hadith. Notable works include Qāwā‘id fī ‘Ulūm al-Hadīth by Zafar Ahmad Usmani, which is an introduction to his monumental work I'la al-Sunan. This work was edited and annotated by Abd al-Fattah Abu Ghudda, who printed it separately, covering a range of topics related to Usul al-Hadith. Mabādī’ Ilm al-Hadīth wa Usūluh by Shabbir Ahmad Usmani is the introduction to his commentary on Sahīh Muslim, Fath al-Mulhim. This work was also edited and annotated by Abd al-Fattāh Abū Ghuddah and printed separately. Other works include Minhat al-Mughīth by Muhammad Idris Kandhlawi, Ilm al-Hadīth by Ashfāq al-Rahmān Kāndhlawī, Jawāhir al-Usūl fī Usūl al-Hadīth by ‘Abd al-Rahmān Murdānī, Ahsan al-Khabar fī Mabādi’ Ilm al-Athar by Muhammad Hasan al-Bashārawī, Ulūm al-Hadīth by Muhammad Ubayd Allāh al-Asadī, Miftāh al-Hadīth by Abdul Jalīl Qāsimī, Fawā’id Jāmi’ah by Abdul Halīm Nu’māni, Basā’ir al-Sunnah by Amīnul Haqq Murdānī, Al-Hadīth al-Hasan by Nimatullāh A’żamī, Ta’dīl Rijāl al-Bukhārī by Habib al-Rahman al-'Azmi, Fann Asmā’ al-Rijāl and Kitāb al-Mu’jam li Rijāl al-Bukhārī by Nizamuddin Asir Adrawi.

Marginalia 
Hadith marginalia, also known as Hawashi, are concise annotations or footnotes written by Islamic scholars in the margins of hadith texts. The scholars of the Deoband school have authored numerous marginalia on various Islamic texts, including hadith books. Some of the notable ones written on popular hadith works include Sahih al-Bukhari by Ahmad Ali Saharanpuri, Abd al-‘Aziz Punjabi (titled Miqbās al-Wārī), Muhammad Tāhir Murdani, and ‘Abd al-Jabbar A‘żami; Jāmi‘ al-Tirmidhī by Ahmad ‘Alī Sahāranpūrī, Majid Ali Jaunpuri, Ashraf Ali Thanwi (titled al-Thawāb al-Hulī); Sunan Abī Dāwūd by Fakhr al-Hasan Gangohi, Muhammad Hayat Sanbhali, Majid ‘Ali Manawi; Sunan al-Nasa’ī by Ashfaq al-Rahman Kandhlawi; Suan Ibn Mājah by Ashfaq al-Rahman Kandhlawi, Fakhr al-Hasan Gangohi, and Anwar Shah Kashmiri; and Muwatta Malik by Ashfaq al-Rahman Kandhlawi.

Additionally, there are marginalia on other hadith works, such as Anwar Shah Kashmiri's notes on Athar al-Sunan of al-Shawq Nimawi; Zakariyya Kandhlawi's notes on Lami' al-Darārī, al-Kawkab al-Durrī, and Badhl al-Majhūd; Ashiq Ilahi Bulandshahri's notes on al-Rasā'il al-Thalāth of Shah Waliullah Dehlawi; Abd al-'Aziz Punjabi and Muhammad Yusuf Kamilpuri's notes on Nasb al-Rāyah entitled Bughyat al-Alma'ī; and Zakariyya Kandhlawi's notes on al-Ishā'ah fī Ashrāt al-Sā'ah of Muhammad ibn Abd al-Rasul al-Barzanji.

The marginalia of Ahmad Ali Saharanpuri can be seen on the prints of Sahih al-Bukhari, Jami' al-Tirmidhi, and Mishkat al-Masabih, which are widely available in India.

Editing manuscripts 
To establish the authenticity and accuracy of hadith manuscripts, a critical investigation and analysis of the text and the chain of narrators is required. To sustain this practise, Deobandi scholars have edited and published a variety of publications. Nasb al-Rāyah fī Takhrīj Ahādīth al-Hidāyah by Jamal al-Din al-Zayla’i, edited and annotated by Abdul Aziz Punjabi and Muhammad Yusuf al-Kamilfuri, and corrected by Yusuf Banuri, is one of the noteworthy works. Moreover, Muhammad Mustafa Azmi edited Sahih Ibn Khuzaymah, and Ashiq Ilahi Bulandshahri edited Jam al-Fawā’id min Jāmi al-Usūl wa Majma al-Zawā’id by Muhammad ibn Muhammad al-Maghrib. Moreover, Arshad Madani and Muhammad Tāhir al-Fattani revised and annotated Badr al-Din al-Ayni's commentary on Sharh Mā’ānī al-Āthār, titled Nukhab al-Afkār fī Tanqīh Mabānī al-Akhbār.

Habib al-Rahman al-'Azmi is among the prominent Deobandi scholars who played a crucial role in reviving numerous classical hadith manuscripts in the 20th century. He edited and annotated various works, including Muṣannaf ʿAbd al-Razzāq al-Sanʿānī, Musannaf Ibn Abi Shaybah (which he was unable to complete before his passing), Al-Musnad of Abdallah ibn al-Zubayr al-Humaydi, Al-Sunan of Sa'id ibn Mansur, Kitab al-Zuhd wa al-Raqa'iq of Abd Allah ibn al-Mubarak, Al-Matalib al-Aliyah bi Zawaid al-Masanid al-Thamaniyah of Ibn Hajar al-Asqalani, Mukhtasar al-Targhib wa al-Tarhib of Ibn Hajar, Kashf al-Astar an Zawaid al-Bazzar of Nur al-Din al-Haythami, and Majma Bihar al-Anwar of Muhammad Tahir al-Fattani. His invaluable contributions to the field of Hadith studies have ensured the preservation and accuracy of the Hadith tradition.

Fiqh al-Hadith 
Fiqh al-Hadith is the study of Islamic jurisprudence based on Hadith literature. Deobandi scholars have made significant contributions in this field. They published I'la al-Sunan by Zafar Ahmad Usmani, an encyclopedia of Hadiths related to fiqhi rulings, and edited and published many old books written by earlier Hanafi scholars, such as Bughyat al-Alma'i fi Takhrij al-Zaila'i, Al-Hujjah 'ala Ahl al-Madīnah, Sharh Kitab al-Athar, Fath al-Rahman fi Ithbat Madhhab al-Nu'man, and Rasool-e-Akram Ka Tariqa-e-Namaz. Deobandi scholars hadith commentaries generally contain jurisprudential material, such as Awjaz al-Masalik by Zakariyya Kandhlawi, Faiz al-Bari by Anwar Shah Kashmiri, Fath al-Mulhim by Shabbir Ahmad Usmani, Badhl al-Majhud by Khalil Ahmad Saharanpuri, and Ma'rif al-Sunan by Yusuf Banuri. One of the important works on Fiqh al-Hadith is Fath al-Rahman Fi Isbat-e-Mazhab al-Noman, authored by 'Abd al-Haqq al-Dehlawi and edited by Nizam-uddin.

Reconciliation 
Hadith reconciliation is the process of finding a suitable interpretation and reconciliation between divergent ahadith (narrations) that present contradictory information. Instead of dismissing any of the ahadith, Deobandi scholars make an effort to reconcile them so that every narration can be practiced without leaving any out. Among these scholars, Muhammad Yunus Jaunpuri stands out for his four-volume collection, Al-Yawāqīt al-Ghāliyah, which is a unique compendium of articles, questions and answers, and treatises on various Hadith matters. The collection is particularly noteworthy for its exhaustive review of narrations in the four Sunan, which are the collections of hadith literature compiled by Abu Dawud, Tirmidhi, Nasa'i, and Ibn Majah, that have been critiqued and deemed to be fabricated.

Contemporary need 
Deobandi scholars have produced an extensive collection of Arabic and Urdu books on hadith to address contemporary challenges and meet the demands of their time. Notable Arabic works include Jāmi al-Āthār by Ashraf Ali Thanwi, which remained unfinished due to his academic workload. Another work, Ashraf Ali Thanwi's Al-Tasharruf bi Ma‘rifat Ahādīth al-Tasawwuf concentrates on hadiths pertaining to Sufism. Theology-related topics are covered in Al-‘Anāqīd al-Ghāliyah by Ashiq Ilahi Bulandshahri and hadith science is covered in Alfiyyat al-Hadīth by Manzoor Nomani. Other works include Al-Tasrīh bi Mā Tawātar fī Nuzūl al-Masīh by Anwar Shah Kashmiri, Juz' fī Hajjat al-Wadā' wa 'Umrāt al-Rasūl by Zakariyya Kandhlawi, Zād al-Tālibīn by Ashiq Ilahi Bulandshahri, and Al-Sayf al-Mujallā 'alā al-Muhallā by Mahdi Hasan Shahjahanpuri, which is a four-volume refutation of the isolated views of Ibn Hazm in his book al-Muhallā. Intikhāb Mishkāt al-Masābīh and Al-Ahādīth al-Muntakhabah fī al-Sifāt al-Sitt were also written by Ilyas Kandhlawi, while ‘Abd al-Rashīd Nu‘mānī authored Mā Tamassu ilayh al-Hājah, which was edited and annotated by Abd al-Fattah Abu Ghudda and retitled Al-Imām Ibn Mājah wa Kitābuhu al-Sunan. Ubayd Allāh al-As‘adī authored Bayn al-Da‘īf wa al-Mawdū, Abd al-‘Azīz Punjābī wrote Fihris Musnad Ahmad and Tabwīb Musnad Ahmad, and Habib al-Rahman al-'Azmi conducted an academic critique of Shaykh Ahmad Shākir's marginalia on Musnad Ahmad, which was later added by Shākir to subsequent prints of the book. Finally, Al Madkhal ila Ulum al Hadith al Sharif was authored by Muhammad Abdul Malek.

Further noteworthy Arabic works on hadith by Deobandi scholars include Hayāt al-Sahābah by Yusuf Kandhlawi, which delved into the lives of the companions of the Prophet Muhammad, and Makānat al-Imām Abū Hanīfah fi al-Hadīth by Abd al-Rashīd Nu‘mānī, which examined the position of Abu Hanifa in the field of hadith. Moreover, there were also critical analyses and annotations of existing hadith works, like Ta‘qīb al-Taqlīb al-Wāqi’ fī Tahdhīb al-Tahdhīb by Muhammad Ayyūb al-Sahāranpūrī, which identified errors in Ibn Hajar al-Asqalani's Tahdhīb al-Tahdhīb.

Some notable Urdu works include Tarjumān al-Sunnah and Jawāhir al-Hikam by Badr-e- Alam Mirathi, which are translations and explanations of hadiths, Ma'ārif al-Sunnah by Ihtishām al-Hasan Kāndhlawī, which delves into the understanding of the Sunnah, and Fazail-e-Amaal by Zakariyya Kandhlawi, which explores the virtues of good deeds. Other noteworthy works include Tajrīd al-Bukhārī by Muhammad Hayāt al-Sanbhalī, Intikhāb al-Sihāh al-Sittah by Zayn al-Abidin Sajjad Meerthi, Intikhāb al-Targhīb by ‘Abd Allāh Tāriq, Ma‘ārif al-Hadīth by Manzoor Nomani, and Ibn Mājah Aur ‘Ilm-e Hadīth by Abd al-Rashīd Nu‘mānī.

Muḥaddithūn 
Muhaddith (plural=muḥaddithūn) is an Arabic term that refers to a scholar of hadith, which is the body of literature comprising the narrations of the sayings, actions, and tacit approvals of the Prophet Muhammad, as well as those of his companions. A Muhaddith is someone who has devoted themselves to the study of hadith and has specialized knowledge in this field. Deobandi scholars have made significant contributions to the field of Hadith studies. Here are some notable Deobandi Muhaddiths and their roles in Hadith studies:

Mahmud Hasan Deobandi was a prominent Islamic scholar, born in 1851 and passed away in 1920, with a profound expertise in Hadith. He studied under Muhammad Qasim Nanautavi and Ahmad Ali Saharanpuri and began teaching the books of hadith at 25. At the age of around 37, he became the Sadr Mudarris and Shaykhul Hadith of Deoband, and taught at Darul Uloom Deoband for almost 44 years. His knowledge extended to the Mazaahib of the four Imaams, with a particular specialization in the Hanafi school. Among his notable works in hadith studies are Al-Abwāb wa Al-Tarājim li al-Bukhāri, which provides a comprehensive explanation of the chapter headings and titles in Bukhari's collection of hadith, alongside biographical information on the narrators of the hadith. He also wrote Tas'hīh Abu Dawūd, a correction and verification of the collection of hadith by Abu Dawud, which aims to remove any discrepancies or errors in the collection and ensure its authenticity.

Muhammad Abdul Malek, a renowned scholar of Hadith in Bangladesh, was born on August 29, 1969. He studied for three years under Abdur Rashid Nomani and two years under Taqi Usmani, gaining expertise in advanced Hadith and Fiqh. Later, he conducted two and a half years of research on Hadith with Abd al-Fattah Abu Ghudda in Saudi Arabia. Currently, he serves as the Dean of the Department of Hadith at Markaz ad-Dawah al-Islamia, where he has earned significant recognition among scholars for his extensive research activities on various subjects, including Hadith. His magnum opus, Al Madkhal ila Ulum al Hadith al Sharif, is widely used as a textbook in the Muslim world. In addition, he has authored several notable research works, including Al-Waziz Fi Shayee Min Mustalahil Hadeeth Sharif and Muhadirat fi Ulumul Hadith.

Acknowledgement 
Foreign Islamic scholars have lauded the Indian Deobandi scholars for their exemplary commentaries and invaluable contributions to the field of hadith. Among those who expressed their appreciation is the renowned Egyptian scholar, Rashid Rida, who credited the Indian scholars for keeping the art of hadith science alive in the East, which had weakened in other regions. Likewise, Abdul Azeez Kholi extolled the Indian brothers for their exceptional contributions. Yousuf al-Sayid Hashim al-Rufa'i, a respected Shafiʿi scholar and former minister of state from Kuwait, praised the services provided by Darul Uloom Deoband in the development of hadith. During a public function, he emphasized the need for scholars like Al-Dhahabi and Ibn Hajar al-Asqalani to counter objections against Islam and expressed pride in the caliber of scholars present at Darul Ulum.

Furthermore, the expert Muhammad Zahid al-Kawthari, Shaykh al-Islām of the Ottoman Empire, also commended the services rendered by the Deobandi scholars, stating that their commentaries on the six authentic books of hadith are enriched with a wide range of ruling materials. Their contributions in regard to the prophetic traditions are beyond mere appreciation. Commentaries such as Fath al-Mulhim, Bazl al-Majhood, and Al-Arf al-Shazi provide satisfactory explanations for matters pertaining to contradictory issues.

See also 
 Index of Deobandi movement–related articles

References 

Deobandi hadith studies
Hadith studies
Sunni hadith collections